Binfield is a village and civil parish in Berkshire, England.

Binfield may also refer to:

Binfield F.C., an English football club
Binfield, Isle of Wight, a hamlet on the Isle of Wight

People with the surname
Gary Binfield (1966–2008), British swimmer
 Ernest Binfield Havell, English arts administrator

See also
Binfield Heath, a village and civil parish in Oxfordshire, England